Ilz or ILZ may refer to:

 Ilz, a river in Germany
 ILZ, the IATA code for Žilina Airport
 Ilz, Styria, a town in Austria

See also 
 Ilze Hattingh
 Ilze Jaunalksne